The seal of the Senate of the Philippines is the seal officially adopted by the Senate of the Philippines to authenticate certain official documents. The seal is of the Office of the Senate and not to any members of the Senate including the president of the Senate.

Description
The Seal of the Philippine Senate was adopted from the Coat of Arms of the Philippines which was approved on July 15, 1950. Other elements were added to the coat of arms to emphasize the legislative function of the Senate. A garland with six sampaguita buds are placed on both the left and right side of the coat of arms. The twelve buds represents the 12 regions of the Philippines at the time of the seal's adoption. The sampaguita flowers likewise symbolizes honor and dignity.

Below the coat of arms are the Latin inscription Legis Servitae Pax Fiat (English:Law Serves Peace, Let It be Done). 24 stars are encircled around the coat of arms representing the 24 elected senators of the Senate of the Philippines.

References

Senate of the Philippines
Philippine Senate